"What About Now" is a song recorded by American country music group Lonestar. It was released in April 2000 as the fourth single from their 1999 album Lonely Grill and it spent four weeks at the top of the Billboard Hot Country Singles & Tracks (now Hot Country Songs) chart.  It was written by Ron Harbin, Aaron Barker and Anthony L. Smith.

Critical reception
Deborah Evans Price, of Billboard magazine reviewed the song favorably, saying that what makes the single work is Richie McDonald's "endearing style, made so apparent with the mega success of 'Amazed'." She says that McDonald "projects a sincerity that propels the lyrical content nicely" and that the "crisp production" highlights the playing.

Track listing
US promo CD single
"What About Now" – 3:30

US vinyl 7" single
"What About Now" – 3:30
"Smile" – 3:33

UK & Europe CD single
"What About Now" (Remix) – 3:30
"What About Now" (Original Mix) – 3:26
"Amazed" (Captain Mix) – 4:29

Chart positions

Weekly charts

Year-end charts

References

2000 singles
1999 songs
Lonestar songs
Songs written by Aaron Barker
Songs written by Ron Harbin
Songs written by Anthony L. Smith
Song recordings produced by Dann Huff
BNA Records singles